The Kraybill Conflict Style Inventory (KCSI, also known by the book title Style Matters) is a conflict style inventory developed in the 1980s by Dr. Ronald S. Kraybill.  Like the widely used Thomas Kilmann Inventory (TKI), it is built around the Mouton-Blake grid and identifies five styles of responding to conflict, in this case: directing, harmonizing, avoiding, cooperating, and compromising.

The Kraybill model takes into consideration conflict response styles when things are going well ("calm") and when conflict increases ("storm"). KCSI is different from predecessors in the Mouton-Blake tradition in encouraging users to consider options for cultural adaptability, taking into account variation in participants' responses as appropriate to individualistic or collectivistic cultures.

Questions are in Likert Scale format, with users choosing a response on a scale of 1–7.  Interpretation pages give principles for interpretation and tips for maximizing effectiveness of each style.

According to the publisher's website, a PhD study in 2004 found it valid and reliable, however the research sample was small, less than a dozen subjects.  In a second larger study, researchers at West Chester University of Pennsylvania administered Style Matters to more than 300 subjects and rated the inventory well on validity and reliability, standard benchmarks of consistency and accuracy of measurement in testing.

In his 2015 doctoral thesis, "The Effect of Student-Generated Case Studies on Conflict Resolution Style Development", David Nemitz used the Style Matters inventory to assess the impact of conflict resolution training on graduate students.

See also
 Conflict style inventory
 Conflict resolution research
 Interpersonal communication
 Negotiation
 Nonviolent Communication
 Peace and conflict studies

References

External links
 RiverhouseEpress.com - the publisher's website.

Dispute resolution
Personality tests